On March 30, 2010 Cisco unveiled a new series of home networking products called "Valet". The focus of this series is to simplify the installation and configuration of a typical wireless home network by shipping routers partially pre-configured and bundling with them software that aids the user in setting up their network with a step-by-step wizard.

While the early Valet routers are based on variants of Cisco's Linksys routers, the Valet series is not tied to the Linksys brand and is marketed separately.

Specifications and versions

Valet M10
The Valet M10 along with the Valet Plus M20 were Cisco's first routers in the Valet series. The M10 is a 2.4 GHz single-band 802.11n wireless router featuring 10/100 LAN connectivity. The v1 of this model is equivalent to the Linksys E1000 v1 and WRT160N v3, sharing the same hardware and specifications. It is white in color and features a light blue trim.

Third Party Firmware: DD-WRT & Tomato Firmware releases have been known to work on the v1 unit.

Valet Plus M20
The M20 is a 2.4 GHz single-band 802.11n wireless router featuring gigabit LAN connectivity. This model is equivalent to the Linksys WRT310N v2, also sharing the same hardware and specifications. It is white in color and features a silver trim.

Default settings
 IP address: 192.168.1.1
 Web interface username: "admin"
 Password: "admin"

References

Wireless networking
Hardware routers
Linux-based devices